Syed Abdul Rahiman Bafakhy Thangal Memorial Government College, Koyilandy, popularly known as SARBTM Govt. College, Koyilandy was established in 1975 at Koyilandy, Kozhikode, Kerala and then moved in 1986 to current campus in Muchukunnu about 7 km north east of Koyilandy Town. It was named after the great social reformer Sayyid Abdurrahiman Bafaqi Thangal who hailed from Koyilandy.  Bafaqi Thangal, honoured by the title Qaid al Qawm, was instrumental in the reform and modernisation of the minority community that happened during the past century and promoted the advent of modern educational institutions of education. The college is affiliated to the University of Calicut and accredited B-Grade by the National Assessment and Accreditation Council.

Courses Offered 
SARBTM Govt. College Koyilandy offers the following courses:

 Bachelor of Science in Physics
 Bachelor of Arts in History
 Bachelor of Commerce
 Bachelor of Science in Mathematics
 Master of Science in Physics
 Master of Commerce

Alumni 
 Shri. Gopikrishnan, regular cartoonist of Mathrubhoomi newspaper

External links

References 
 http://www.universityofcalicut.info/index.php?option=com_content&task=view&id=694
 http://keralaeducations.com/_sarbtm
 http://www.kerala-colleges.com/Kerala-Districts-India/Kerala-College-Courses.asp?D=780
 http://www.highereducationinindia.com/institutes/sarbtm-govt-college-koyilandy-7341.php
http://www.gckoyilandy.org

Arts and Science colleges in Kerala
Colleges affiliated with the University of Calicut
Universities and colleges in Kozhikode district
1975 establishments in Kerala
Educational institutions established in 1975